Chawpi Urqu (Quechua chawpi central, middle, urqu mountain, "central mountain", also spelled Chaupi Orkho) is a mountain in the Bolivian Andes which reaches a height of approximately . It is located in the Potosí Department, Tomás Frías Province, Potosí Municipality. It lies southeast of Jatun Q'asa.

References 

Mountains of Potosí Department